The Dream Weaver is a solo album by Gary Wright released in July 1975.

The album was said by Wright to be the first-ever all-keyboard album (though there were many all-synthesizer LPs before this, including Switched-On Bach by Wendy Carlos, in 1968), but in fact it also features drums, vocals, and guitar, among other instruments. The performers include David Foster, Bobby Lyle, and Wright himself on keyboards, and Jim Keltner and Andy Newmark on drums. The track "Power of Love" featured Wright's Warner Bros. labelmate Ronnie Montrose on electric guitar.

The album's success was a slow but steady accomplishment as the album eventually peaked at number 7 on Billboard Top LPs & Tape chart in the spring of 1976. The album's title cut (unlike the album, the song omits the article "The") and "Love Is Alive" both peaked at number 2 on the Billboard Hot 100 singles chart.

Track listing
All songs written by Gary Wright except where noted.

Personnel
Gary Wright – lead and backing vocals, Fender Rhodes electric piano, Hammond organ, Hohner clavinet, Moog synthesizers, ARP String Ensemble, woodwinds, special effects
David Foster – Fender Rhodes electric piano, Hammond organ, ARP String Ensemble
Bobby Lyle – Hohner clavinet, Fender Rhodes electric piano
Ronnie Montrose – electric guitar (track 5)
Andy Newmark – drums
Jim Keltner – drums
Lorna Wright, Betty Sweet, and David Pomeranz – backing vocals

Production
Arranged and produced by Gary Wright
Recorded and engineered by Jay Lewis
Mastered by Doug Sax
Illustrations by Mick Haggerty and Ed Scarsbrick
Photography by Norman Seeff

Charts

Singles - Billboard (United States) :

References

External links
 Gary Wright - The Dream Weaver (1975) album releases & credits at Discogs
 Gary Wright - The Dream Weaver (1975) album to be listened on Spotify

Gary Wright albums
1975 albums
Warner Records albums
Electronic music